The 1934 South American Basketball Championship was the 3rd edition of this regional tournament. It was held in Buenos Aires, Argentina and won by the host Argentina national basketball team. 4 teams competed.

Final rankings

Results

Each team played the other three teams twice apiece, for a total of six games played by each team.  The top two teams after this round played each other one more time in the final.

External links

FIBA.com archive for SAC1934

1934
S
B
Sports competitions in Buenos Aires
1934 in Argentine sport
Champ
1930s in Buenos Aires
April 1934 sports events